Peter Dursun (born 8 January 1975) is a former Danish footballer, who played for Southend United in the Football League in 1996.

Dursun made his debut in the Division One for Southend United on 14 December 1996, away to Queens Park Rangers in the 4–0 defeat, replacing Julian Hails in the 53rd minute.

He then played for Aarhus Fremad, and Hvidovre IF.

References

External links
Danish Superliga statistics

Living people
1975 births
Footballers from Aarhus
Danish men's footballers
Danish Superliga players
Southend United F.C. players
Hvidovre IF players
Brønshøj Boldklub players
English Football League players

Association football midfielders